Vigdis Hjulstad Belbo (born 7 August 1955) is a Norwegian politician for the Centre Party.

She served as a deputy representative to the Norwegian Parliament from Nord-Trøndelag during the terms 1993–1997 and 1997–2001

On the local level Belbo is the mayor of Snåsa since 2003. She was previously deputy mayor, and has chaired the county party chapter.

References

1955 births
Living people
Deputy members of the Storting
Centre Party (Norway) politicians
Mayors of places in Nord-Trøndelag
Women mayors of places in Norway
20th-century Norwegian women politicians
20th-century Norwegian politicians
Women members of the Storting